Henry Stenhouse (1882–unknown) was an English footballer who played in the Football League for Newcastle United.

References

1882 births
English footballers
Association football forwards
English Football League players
Blyth Spartans A.F.C. players
Newcastle United F.C. players
Ashington A.F.C. players
Year of death missing